Class Divide is a 2015 documentary film by Marc Levin about gentrification. The film premiered at the 2015 DOC NYC.

Description
The documentary shows the effects of gentrification in Chelsea subsequent to the creation of the High Line park on the population of the neighbourhood. Since the rehabilitation of the old railways of the High Line into an urban park, the real estate market in the neighbourhood increased sharply. The documentary illustrates the impact of the changes this incurs in the life of the residents with the establishment of the for-profit private school Avenues just opposite on 10th avenue and 25-26th streets of the Chelsea-Elliott housing project which offers accommodation for low-income inhabitants (in the documentary, it is reported that tuition at Avenues costs between 40 000 and 50 000$ per year while the average income in the housing project complexes is 21 000$ per year with an unemployment rate about 58%). Marc Levin follows families from the Avenues school and from Chelsea-Elliott Houses. Focusing on the children and young adults from both sides of 10th avenue, the documentary shows the discrepancies in living situation, expectations and opportunities between them. It also shows their understanding of the situation and of each other.

References

2015 films
HBO documentary films
Works about gentrification
2010s English-language films
2010s American films